The 1996–97 NBA season was the Spurs' 21st season in the National Basketball Association, and 30th season as a franchise. During the off-season, the Spurs signed free agent and former All-Star forward Dominique Wilkins, who previously played overseas in Greece last season, while re-signing former Spurs guard Vernon Maxwell. However, without All-Star center David Robinson, who only played just six games due to back and foot injuries, and three-point specialist Chuck Person, who was out for the entire season with an off-season back injury, the Spurs struggled losing 13 of their first 15 games in November, which included an 8-game losing streak. After 18 games, head coach Bob Hill was fired and replaced with general manager Gregg Popovich. As of 2023, Popovich currently remains as head coach of the Spurs.

Wilkins appeared in 63 games with the Spurs, averaging 18.2 points and 6.4 rebounds per game. However, it would not be nearly enough as Sean Elliott only played just 39 games due to a knee injury, and Charles D. Smith only appeared in just 19 games also with a knee injury. The Spurs held a 11–34 record at the All-Star break, then later on lost their final six games, finishing sixth in the Midwest Division with an awful 20–62 record. The Spurs had the worst team defensive rating in the NBA. 

Robinson averaged 17.7 points and 8.5 rebounds per game during his short six-game stint, while Elliott averaged 14.9 points per game, Maxwell provided the team with 12.9 points per game, Vinny Del Negro contributed 12.3 points per game, and Avery Johnson provided with 10.5 points, 6.8 assists and 1.3 steals per game. In addition, Monty Williams showed improvement averaging 9.0 points per game, while Will Perdue provided with 8.7 points, 9.8 rebounds and 1.6 blocks per game, Carl Herrera contributed 8.0 points and 4.5 rebounds per game, and Greg Anderson averaged 3.9 points and 5.5 rebounds per game.

Since the Spurs joined the NBA in 1976, this was only the fourth time they missed the playoffs. Until 2020, this was the Spurs' last season in which they failed to make the playoffs, due in large part to turning the lottery pick they earned in 1997 into perennial All-Star Tim Duncan, who would create a dynasty that won them their first championship 2 years later, then four more championships in 2003, 2005, 2007, and 2014. Following the season, Wilkins left to play overseas in Italy, while Maxwell was released to free agency, Anderson re-signed as a free agent with the Atlanta Hawks, and Smith retired.

Draft picks

The Spurs did not have any draft picks in 1996.

Roster

Roster Notes
Small forward Chuck Person missed the entire season due to a back injury.

Regular season
The Spurs were trying to continue the success of the last two seasons which had records of 59-23 and 62-20 respectively. However they would finish a dismal 20–62, Scoring leader David Robinson was injured, and was only able to play just six games due to back and foot injuries. Also injured was forward and three-point specialist Chuck Person, who missed the entire season with an off-season back injury. Head coach Bob Hill was fired midway through the season after starting 3-15, being replaced by Gregg Popovich, who would finish 17–47. He would later be appointed head coach after the season's end. This would be the only losing season for Gregg Popovich and the first losing season for the Spurs since the 1988-89 NBA season. However the lone silver lining in this season would be winning the number one pick for the 1997 NBA Draft.

Season standings

z - clinched division title
y - clinched division title
x - clinched playoff spot

Record vs. opponents

Player statistics

References

See also
1996-97 NBA season

San Antonio Spurs seasons
San Antonio
San Antonio
San Antonio